Holy Molar is a noise rock band from San Diego, composed of members Mark McCoy (of Charles Bronson, Virgin Mega Whore, and Das Oath), Bobby Bray, Justin Pearson, and Gabe Serbian (all of The Locust) and Maxamillion Avila (of Antioch Arrow, Heroin, and Final Conflict).

History 
Holy Molar are a San Diego-based band formed in 2001. The band consisted of vocalist Mark McCoy (under the stage name Mark McMolar), guitarist Gabe Serbian, bassist Justin Pearson, drummer Maxamillion Avila and keyboardist Bobby Bray. The band dressed in white lab coats, medical masks, and sometimes appeared spattered with blood.

The band released a live album in 2001, titled Live at the Metropolitan Correctional Center. In 2003, the band released their first album The Whole Tooth and Nothing but the Tooth. The band had additionally issued a split with Ex Models in 2004 and an EP, Cavity Search, in 2007.

The band had never officially disbanded, leaving their record label, Three One G to state, "As for Holy Molar, the project has never officially disbanded—you never know, perhaps one day it will emerge from the depths, bringing with it its trademark bursts of shrieks and screams, much like a cavity left unattended or a bad root canal."

Members 
 Mark McMolar – vocals
 Gabe Serbian – guitar
 Justin Pearson – bass
 Maxamillion Avila – drums
 Bobby Bray – keyboards

Discography 
Albums
 The Whole Tooth and Nothing but the Tooth (2003, Three One G)

EPs/splits
 Ex Models/Holy Molar (2004, Three One G)
 Cavity Search (2007, Three One G)

Live albums
 Live at the San Diego Metropolitan Correctional Center (2001, Three One G)

DVDs
 Dentist the Menace (2006, Three One G)

External links 
 Holy Molar MySpace Page

References 

American noise rock music groups
Musical groups from San Diego
Musical groups established in 2001